Torsten Furukrantz (21 June 1937 – 12 September 2019) was a Swedish footballer who played as a defender for IFK Stockholm, Djurgårdens IF, and IK Sirius.

Career
Furukrantz made his debut in the Swedish Division 2 with IFK Stockholm in 1959. He remained at the club until 1963 when he joined Djurgårdens IF. At Djurgården, he debuted in May 1963 against Hammarby IF. In 1964 he won Allsvenskan. In 1966, Furukrantz was one of five championship-winning players which signed with IK Sirius. He stayed at IK Sirius until 1973 and became a coach in 1974.

Honours
Djurgårdens IF
 Allsvenskan: 1964

References

1937 births
2019 deaths
Association football defenders
Swedish footballers
Allsvenskan players
IFK Stockholm players
Djurgårdens IF Fotboll players
IK Sirius Fotboll players
Footballers from Stockholm